The European Inter-University Centre for Human Rights and Democratisation (EIUC) is an interdisciplinary centre covering the area of human rights education and research formed by 41 universities from all European Union member states. The EIUC's activities include interdisciplinary education of students worldwide; developing training for senior officials of international organisations, field personnel, and other human rights professionals; identifying means of transferring academic expertise to the public, such as using visual arts and mass media; creating an environment for research cooperation; representing a network of graduates of the European Master's Programme in Human Rights and Democratisation. The centre is housed in the Monastery of San Nicolò al Lido which has been made available to the EIUC by the Municipality of Venice, Italy.

Administration 

 Prof. Dr. Horst Fischer, EIUC President (since 2002).
 Prof. Florence Benoît-Rohmer, EIUC Secretary General (since 2009).
 Prof. Ria Wolleswinkel, E.MA Chairperson (since 2013).

E.MA Programme Directors 

 Dr Anja Mihr (2006-2008). 
Dr. Pietro Sullo (starting 2013).
 Dr Andraž Zidar (starting 2015).
 Prof. George Ulrich (from 2001- 2004 and from 2016-).

Consortium

Non-Consortium Experts 
The following are experts involved in the E.MA, having helped with teaching or thesis supervising from other institutions:

E.MA Kosovo Field Trip 

Every year this field trip is a pivotal element of the E.MA and has been organized since the Programme’s inception, first in Bosnia and Herzegovina (1998-2003) and then in Kosovo since 2004. This part of the course aims at providing deeper insights into the practical tasks, difficulties, and expectations with which human rights officers in the field are faced, and to get a better understanding of the real situation in a post-conflict country. Students usually go to Kosovo in January. The training comprises visits to international organisations and institutions as well as local and regional non-governmental organisations working on the most essential human rights issues, such as property claims, torture related questions, legal advice, women’s rights, democratic elections, free media and children’s rights. The field trip also consists of short excursions to Priština. Students usually stay with host families and are required to participate in all activities and events organised by the E.MA academic staff, external facilitators from the EU and other experts. The trip has long been coordinated by Marijana Grandits from the University of Vienna and the local representatives at the University of Pristina (Albanian: Universiteti i Prishtinës) whose Faculty of Philology is usually the main meeting point.

Extracurricular 
EIUC organises The Venice School of Human Rights for postgraduate students from all academic backgrounds, The Venice Academy of Human Rights for advanced students and worldwide distinguished experts, and a series of advanced training courses dedicated to helping officials of international organisations, field personnel, and E.MA graduates transfer academic and institutional expertise into the public sphere.

Venue 
The venue is the Benedictine Monastery of San Nicolò al Lido, situated on the lagoon side of the Lido di Venezia, conceded by the City of Venice in 1998 and became the seat of E.MA in 2002 with the establishment of the EIUC. The monastery was founded in the 11th century and transformed into a Renaissance cloister in the 16th century. After the suppression of the Benedictine order in 1770, the monastery was re-opened by Franciscan monks for educational purposes.

International Research Projects 
The EIUC participates in different international research projects (such as FRAME), it regularly organises high level conferences, seminars and workshops on the latest scientific and academic developments, and it is a member of the Association of Human Rights Institutions (AHRI). In March 2007, EIUC launched a series entitled “EIUC Studies on Human Rights and Democratisation” published by Cambridge University Press.

References 
https://eiuc.org/about-us/eiuc-global-campus/universities.html

Sources 

Human rights organisations based in Italy
International research institutes
Organisations based in Venice
University-affiliated schools
Europe-centric
Human rights
Democracy
Democracy activists